Rachad Chitou (born 18 September 1976) is a Beninese footballer who played as a goalkeeper for Wikki Tourists.

Career
Chitou began playing football with local side AS Dragons FC de l'Ouémé before spells abroad in Ghana and Nigeria.

International career
He was part of the Beninese 2004 African Nations Cup team, who finished bottom of their group in the first round of competition, thus failing to qualify for the next round.

Managerial career
After he retired from playing, Chitou was a football analysts and received a coaching license. Next, he managed local side Avrankou Omnisport FC.

References

External links
 

1976 births
Living people
Beninese footballers
Benin international footballers
2004 African Cup of Nations players
2008 Africa Cup of Nations players
2010 Africa Cup of Nations players
AS Dragons FC de l'Ouémé players
Heart of Lions F.C. players
Wikki Tourists F.C. players
Beninese expatriate footballers
Expatriate footballers in Ghana
Beninese expatriate sportspeople in Ghana
Expatriate footballers in Nigeria
Beninese expatriate sportspeople in Nigeria
Association football goalkeepers